Winchester Stewart Oliphant (February 1, 1849 – June 24, 1945) was an American politician in the state of Washington. He served in the Washington House of Representatives from 1889 to 1891.

References

Republican Party members of the Washington House of Representatives
1849 births
1945 deaths
People from Noble County, Ohio
People from Whitman County, Washington